Diego Alejandro Arias Hincapié (born June 16, 1985) is a Colombian footballer who currently plays for Atlético Huila as a defensive midfielder.

Club career
In January 2011, Arias left Colombia and signed a 1.5-year contract with PAOK, after captaining Once Caldas to the Colombian championship.

International career
On 15 November 2011, Arias made his debut for the senior Colombia national team against Argentina, replacing Jackson Martinez.

Club performance

Statistics accurate as of last match played on 26 November 2016.

1 Includes cup competitions such as Copa Libertadores and Copa Sudamericana.

2 Includes Superliga Colombiana matches.

Honours

Club
Once Caldas
 Categoría Primera A (1): 2010-II
Atlético Nacional
 Categoría Primera A (5): 2013-I, 2013-II, 2014-I , 2015-I,|2017-I]
 Copa Colombia (2): 2013, 2016
 Copa Libertadores (1): 2016

References

External links
 

1985 births
Living people
Colombian footballers
Colombian expatriate footballers
Deportivo Pereira footballers
Once Caldas footballers
PAOK FC players
Cruzeiro Esporte Clube players
Atlético Nacional footballers
Independiente Medellín footballers
Atlético Huila footballers
Categoría Primera A players
Categoría Primera B players
Super League Greece players
Campeonato Brasileiro Série A players
Association football midfielders
Colombian expatriate sportspeople in Greece
Colombian expatriate sportspeople in Brazil
Expatriate footballers in Greece
Expatriate footballers in Brazil
People from Pereira, Colombia